The Bailey Solo is a British paramotor that was designed and produced by Bailey Aviation of Bassingbourn, Royston for powered paragliding. Now out of production, when it was available the aircraft was supplied complete and ready-to-fly.

Design and development
The Solo was designed to comply with the US FAR 103 Ultralight Vehicles rules as well as European regulations. It features a paraglider-style wing, single-place accommodation and a single  Solo 210 engine in pusher configuration with a reduction drive and a  diameter three-bladed composite German Helix-Carbon propeller. The aircraft backpack chassis is built so that it can be quickly disassembled into five parts for ground transport and storage.

As is the case with all paramotors, take-off and landing is accomplished by foot. Inflight steering is accomplished via handles that actuate the canopy brakes, creating roll and yaw.

Specifications (Solo)

References

Solo
2000s British ultralight aircraft
Single-engined pusher aircraft
Paramotors